Patrick Hobsch (born 10 October 1994) is a German professional footballer who plays as a centre-forward for Regionalliga Bayern club SpVgg Unterhaching.

Early life
Hobsch was born in Bremen; he is the son of former footballer Bernd Hobsch and the family moved several times during Bernd's career before settling in Schwarzenbruck (near Nuremberg).

Career
In June 2021, Hobsch signed for SpVgg Unterhaching of the Regionalliga Bayern on a free transfer.

References

External links
 
 

1994 births
Living people
German footballers
Footballers from Bremen
Association football forwards
1. SC Feucht players
SV Seligenporten players
SpVgg Bayreuth players
VfB Lübeck players
SpVgg Unterhaching players
Regionalliga players
Oberliga (football) players
3. Liga players
People from Nürnberger Land
Sportspeople from Middle Franconia
Footballers from Bavaria